Red Creek is a river located in central Otsego County, New York. The creek converges with the Susquehanna River south of Cooperstown, New York.

References

Rivers of New York (state)
Rivers of Otsego County, New York